The Saint Joseph's Metropolitan Cathedral is a Roman Catholic cathedral in Dar es Salaam, Tanzania. It is a Gothic church located in Sokoine Drive, facing the harbour, close to the White Fathers' House. It was built by the Germans between 1897 and 1902 and consecrated as a Catholic church in 1905. The cathedral is the seat of the Dar es Salaam archdiocese. One of the most notable features of the church are the stained-glass windows behind the altar.

Notes

Buildings and structures in Dar es Salaam
Roman Catholic cathedrals in Tanzania
Cathedrals in Tanzania
Tourist attractions in Dar es Salaam